Mist on the Moors is a 1943 Czech drama film directed by František Čáp based on a novel by Karel Klostermann.

Cast
Zdeněk Štěpánek as Farmer Josef Potužák
Marie Blažková as Potužák's wife
Vladimír Salač as Václav, their son
Jarmila Smejkalová as Apolenka, their daughter
Terezie Brzková as Old woman
Rudolf Hrušínský as Farmhand Vojta
Jaroslav Zrotal as Gamekeeper Radonický
Jaroslav Průcha as Farmer Jakub Krušný

Release
In 2020 the movie was officially released online on YouTube  by Czech Film Archive.

References

External links 
 

1943 films
Czech drama films
1943 drama films
1940s Czech-language films
Films directed by František Čáp
Czech black-and-white films
1940s Czech films